Isaac W. Carpenter (June 22, 1849 – October 13, 1933) was a Canadian politician. He served in the Legislative Assembly of New Brunswick as an Independent MLA from Queens County. He was elected in 1896 by-election. A farmer, it is likely he was elected as a Patrons of Industry candidate.

References 

1849 births
1933 deaths